Jack English Hightower (September 6, 1926 – August 3, 2013) was a former Democratic U.S. representative from Texas's 13th congressional district.

Early life
Born in Memphis, the seat of Hall County in West Texas, Hightower was a United States Navy sailor for two years during World War II. His parents were Walter Thomas Hightower, a greenhouse proprietor, and Floy Edna (English) Hightower, a homemaker.

Education and law career

In 1949, Hightower received a Bachelor of Arts degree from Baylor University in Waco, Texas. In 1951, he procured an LL.B. from Baylor Law School. Years later in 1992, he obtained an LL.M. from the University of Virginia in Charlottesville, Virginia. He was admitted to the Texas bar in 1951 and immediately became district attorney of the 46th Texas Judicial District, based in Vernon, the seat of Wilbarger County. He served as DA from 1951 to 1961.

Political career
From 1953 to 1955, he was a member of the Texas House of Representatives.

Hightower was an unsuccessful candidate for the U.S. House of Representatives in a special election held in 1961. While still living in Vernon, Hightower served from 1965 to 1974 in two reconfigured districts in the Texas Senate. He was a delegate to the tumultuous 1968 Democratic National Convention, which met in Chicago to nominate Vice President of the United States Hubert H. Humphrey for the presidency. That fall, Humphrey narrowly carried Texas over the Republican Richard M. Nixon and the American Independent Party nominee George Wallace of Alabama.

In 1974, Hightower challenged four-term Republican Bob Price of Pampa for a congressional seat and won.  Hightower was one of several Democrats elected due to voter anger over Watergate.

Hightower was a fairly moderate Democrat, and served a mostly rural district stretching from Amarillo to Wichita Falls on the east.  The district had become increasingly friendly to Republicans at the national level, though Democrats continued to hold most local offices well into the 1990s. Hightower was reelected four times, mainly by stressing constituent services.  However, in 1984, he was toppled by Republican challenger Beau Boulter of Amarillo, who benefited from Ronald W. Reagan's massive reelection landslide that year.

Personal life
After he left Congress, Hightower was from 1985 to 1987 the first assistant attorney general of Texas under Attorney General  Jim Mattox. Hightower was also elected to the Texas Supreme Court in 1988. He was later appointed by U.S. President Bill Clinton to the National Commission on Libraries and Information Science, a position which he held from August 9, 1999, to July 19, 2004.

Hightower married Colleen (née Ward) (1927–2015) in 1950. They first met at Baylor where he was a law student and she was a music major. Colleen died in 2015 and is buried alongside her husband of 63 years. They lived in Austin and had three daughters. He is the step-grandfather of NFL quarterback Drew Brees.

Hightower is not related to former Texas Agriculture Commissioner Jim Hightower.

Death
Hightower died on August 3, 2013, in Austin. Texas Supreme Court Chief Justice Wallace B. Jefferson said, "Texas has lost a true champion among its public servants and the Court has lost a colleague who at his very core was what a judge should be".

References

External links
 Retrieved on 2008-03-31
Memorial Service program - Baylor University

1926 births
2013 deaths
Baylor University alumni
Baylor Law School alumni
University of Virginia School of Law alumni
Democratic Party members of the Texas House of Representatives
Democratic Party Texas state senators
Justices of the Texas Supreme Court
County district attorneys in Texas
People from Memphis, Texas
People from Austin, Texas
People from Vernon, Texas
Military personnel from Texas
United States Navy sailors
Neurological disease deaths in Texas
Deaths from Parkinson's disease
Burials at Texas State Cemetery
Democratic Party members of the United States House of Representatives from Texas
Baptists from Texas
20th-century American politicians
20th-century American judges
20th-century Baptists